The Al Ansar guest house is a name Joint Task Force Guantanamo counter-terrorism analysts have applied to several guest houses they consider suspicious.
Close to one hundred Guantanamo captives had their continued 
extrajudicial detention justified, at least in part, due to allegations 
that they had stayed in suspicious guest houses.

Location

JTF-GTMO allegations place guest houses named al Ansar in Kabul, Afghanistan; Peshawar, Pakistan; and Kandahar.

History
During the Russo-Afghan War, Osama bin Laden and Abdullah Azzam rented a house in University Town, Peshawar, which they named "Beit-al-Ansar" (the House of the Faithful). Here, with the approval of the CIA, the ISI and the Saudi Istikhbarat, they established a logistics base for the thousands of Arab fighters arriving in the city. Bin Laden would vet the volunteers before assigning them to the various Afghan factions 

Bin Laden would lead religious debates, many centred on the Sura Yasin of the Qur'an which are reported to have played a pivotal role in the formation of the al Qaida network.
Saad Al-Faqih, reported to be an expert on al Qaeda's history, has stated that al Qaeda's origin was tied to a computer system situated in the "bait al-Ansar guesthouse"
{|
|valign="top" | TM: ||
You said something interesting in an interview with Frontline back in 1999—and you just repeated it here—namely that al-Qaeda originated from a documentation system in the Bait al-Ansar guesthouse back in the 1980s.
|-
|valign="top" | SF: || 
The term yes, but the organisation's history is much more interesting than that!
|}

At the 2005 bail hearing for Hassan Almrei in Canada, an unidentified Canadian Security Intelligence Service (CSIS) agent named only as J.P. stated that Bayt al-Ansar had been "associated with al-Qaeda... since 1984", although even the most liberal estimates suggest that the group didn't even exist until 1988-1990.

Allegations against Guantanamo captives that involve Al Ansar

According to the Summary of Evidence memo prepared for Sabri Mohammed Ebrahim Al Qurashi's first annual Administrative Review Board, on 26 July 2005:

In the Summary of Evidence memo prepared for Zuhail Abdo Anam Said Al Sharabi's Administrative Review Board hearings he faced the allegations:

{| class="wikitable"
| 
In approximately February 2000, the detainee stayed at the Arab guesthouse run by Abu Khaloud in Kandahar, Afghanistan.
The detainee lived in the Al Ansar guesthouse located in the Karti Barwan neighborhood of Kabul, Afghanistan for fifteen months.  He lived in another nearby guesthouse for eight months.
The detainee trained at a camp located near the Al Ansar guesthouse in Kabul, Afghanistan.  The leader of the camp was Abu Omar Al-Libby.
The detainee stated he lived in the al Ansar guest house located in Kabul, Afghanistan for fifteen months until he moved across the street to a new guest house when the guest house closed.  The detainee lived at the new guest house for eight months.
|}

According to a Summary of Evidence memo was prepared for 
Abdullah Mohammed Khan's first annual
Administrative Review Board, 
on 29 July 2005.

{| class="wikitable"
| 
A Libyan Islamic Fighting Group member identified the detainee in photo as Abdul Latif Al-Turki.  The member said he saw the detainee several times at the Al-Ansar guesthouse in Pakistan.
A source identified the detainee and said he saw the detainee several times at the al Ansar guest house in Peshawar, Pakistan.
|}

According to the Summary of Evidence memo prepared for 
Jalal Salam Awad Awad's 
second annual
Administrative Review Board, 
on 7 February 2006

{| class="wikitable"
| 
The detainee stayed in Kabul, Afghanistan at a guesthouse called al Ansar before deciding to go to the Libyan camp for training.
The al Ansar guest house in Kabul, Afghanistan is a two-story house with a basement.  It accommodates Arabs immigrating to Afghanistan.
|}

References

Al-Qaeda safe houses
Al-Qaeda facilities
Safe houses in Pakistan